UMMS is an initialism, it may stand for:-
University of Massachusetts Medical School
University of Maryland Medical System
University of Michigan Medical School
Minsk International Airport - ICAO code UMMS